Charles F. Fanning, Jr. is an Irish American historian and academic.

Life
He grew up in Norwood, Massachusetts.  He graduated from Harvard College in 1964, with a master's in 1966, and from the University of Pennsylvania with a master's and doctoral degrees, in 1968 and 1972. 
He taught at Bridgewater State College, and at Southern Illinois University Carbondale from 1993 to 2007.
He and his wife, Frances, live in Carbondale, Illinois.  They have two children, Stephen, born in 1982 and Ellen, born in 1984.

A Medal and Lecture in Irish Studies are named for him.

Awards
 2004 Outstanding Scholar, Southern Illinois University Carbondale 
 1989 American Book Award for The Exiles of Erin: Nineteenth-Century Irish-American Fiction
 1979 Frederick Jackson Turner Award from the Organization of American Historians for Finley Peter Dunne and Mr. Dooley: The Chicago Years
 1991 Prize for Literary Criticism from the American Conference for Irish Studies for The Irish Voice in America

Bibliography 
   (reprint 2008 )
 
 (second edition 2000  )
Mapping Norwood: An Irish-American Memoir. University of Massachusetts Press. 2010. .

Editor

References

External links
"IRISH VOICES", Perspectives, Spring 2004

21st-century American historians
American male non-fiction writers
People from Norwood, Massachusetts
Harvard College alumni
University of Pennsylvania alumni
Bridgewater State University faculty
Southern Illinois University Carbondale faculty
Year of birth missing (living people)
Living people
American Book Award winners
Historians from Massachusetts
21st-century American male writers